Tiki-Taka, previously titled as Khelechi Ajgubi, is a 2020 Indian ZEE5 original Bengali language sports drama situational comedy film directed and produced by Parambrata Chattopadhyay. The film stars African national Emona Enabulu in the main lead role while director Parambrata Chattopadhyay, Ritabhari Chakraborty and Saswata Chatterjee play supporting roles in the film. The film was set on the backdrop of West Bengal and other parts of North-East India. The film was premiered via ZEE5 on 11 September 2020 and opened to positive reviews.

Plot 
The storyline of the film revolves around the Senegalese national Khelechi Ajgubi (Emona Enabulu) who has landed in India to fulfill his aspirations of pursuing his career as a professional footballer before falling trap into a comedy of errors.

Cast 

 Emona Enabulu as Kelechi Ajgubi
 Parambrata Chattopadhyay as Raju, taxi-driver
 Ritabhari Chakraborty as Bonny
 Saswata Chatterjee as PK
 Bruno Venchuro
 Kharaj Mukherjee
Surangana Bandyopadhyay as special appearance
Riddhi Sen as special appearance

Production 
The film production originally launched in Bengali language and the film was initially tentatively titled as Khelechi Ajgubi. The principal photography of the film began in March 2018, keeping in mind about the 2018 FIFA World Cup. The directorial venture was announced by actor Parambrata Chattopadhyay who also made his debut as a producer through this project. The film title was later changed to Tiki-Taka which is a technique popularly used in the sport of football. The film was dubbed in Hindi during the COVID-19 pandemic lockdown in India. Senegalese actor Emona Enabulu was roped into play the male lead role. The portions of the film were predominantly shot in Kolkata.

Release 
The film was supposed to have its theatrical release in 2020 but was called off due to the COVID-19 pandemic in India and filmmakers intended to release it via OTT platform. ZEE5 bought the digital distribution rights of the film and was released on the platform on 11 September 2020.

Reception 
After release, Tiki Taka received positive reviews from critics, with praises for the plot, light-hearted comedy and individual performances.

Hindustan Times gave a rating of 4 out of 5 and stated "The laughs are non-stop and the film is light and funny, this one will definitely strike a chord with football fanatics!" Upam Buzarbaruah of Times Of India wrote "Tiki Taka is a nice watch. It boasts of some decent performances. While Parambrata and Emona rule the screen with their chemistry, Ritabhari also delivers her role quite nicely. The rest of the cast, however, have too short a screen presence for us to judge their performances" The Quint wrote "Tiki-Taka is a fast-paced, entertaining watch and also an ode to Kolkata’s obsession with soccer"

References

External links 

 
 Tiki-Taka on ZEE5
Bengali-language Indian films
2020s sports comedy-drama films
2020 multilingual films
2020s Hindi-language films
2020s Bengali-language films
2020 direct-to-video films
2020 comedy-drama films
2020 films
Indian association football films
Indian sports comedy-drama films
Indian multilingual films
ZEE5 original films
Films shot in Kolkata
Films not released in theaters due to the COVID-19 pandemic